Le Bono is a commune in the Morbihan department of Brittany in northwestern France. The commune was also known as Bono until 31 December 2022.

The town was known popularly as Le Bono before the official name change and this was the name used on the road signs.

Inhabitants of Le Bono are called Bonovistes in French.

Breton language
The municipality launched a linguistic plan through Ya d'ar brezhoneg on November 17, 2008.

Gallery

See also
Communes of the Morbihan department

References

External links
  
 

Communes of Morbihan